Seattle Sounders FC is an American soccer club founded in 2008, after the city of Seattle was awarded a Major League Soccer (MLS) franchise. Sounders FC began playing competitive soccer in the 2009 season. It plays its home games at Lumen Field, competing in the Western Conference of the MLS. The current Sounders FC is the third soccer team from Seattle to bear the Sounders nickname. The tradition was started by Seattle's North American Soccer League team in 1974, and continued by the city's United Soccer Leagues side, formed in 1994. The current Sounders FC is an entity distinct to both of these clubs, and played its first MLS game on March 19, 2009.

As of the start of the 2021 season, a total of 125 players have participated in at least one league match for Sounders FC. Fredy Montero is the club's all-time top goal scorer, and Nicolás Lodeiro is club's all-time leader in assists.

Players
A Major League Soccer club's active roster consists of up to 30 players. All 30 players are eligible for selection to each 18-player game-day squad during the regular season and playoffs. Players who were contracted to the club but never played a regular season MLS game are not listed below.

All statistics are for the MLS regular season games only, including the group stage of the 2020 MLS is Back Tournament, and are correct .

Key

DF = Defender

MF = Midfielder

FW = Forward/striker

Outfield players

Goalkeepers

In their history the Seattle Sounders FC have used three primary goalkeepers. US national team member and Seattle area native Kasey Keller was the goalkeeper for the team's first three seasons. In November 2011, just shy of his 42nd birthday, Keller retired. Austrian Michael Gspurning was brought in as Keller's replacement in 2012. After two seasons Gspurning and the Sounders FC front office were unable to come to an agreement on a contract and Gspurning was released. Toronto FC traded Stefan Frei to the Sounders in December 2013. Frei would be the first choice goalkeeper for the Sounders from the 2014 season to present.

By nationality

MLS regulations permit teams to name eight players from outside of the United States in their rosters. However, this limit can be exceeded by trading international slots with another MLS team, or if one or more of the overseas players is a refugee or has permanent residency rights in the USA. , 64 players from outside the United States have played in MLS for Seattle Sounders FC.

Additional players
In addition to competing in Major League Soccer every year, Sounders FC participate in other competitions such as the Lamar Hunt U.S. Open Cup and the CONCACAF Champions League. Below is a list of players who have not appeared in a league match, but have played for the team in other competitions.

See also 
 List of Seattle Sounders (USL) players – list of players who played for Seattle Sounders FC's USL predecessor
 List of Tacoma Defiance players – list of players who play for Seattle Sounders FC's reserve team

Notes

References

Seattle Sounders FC
 
players
Association football player non-biographical articles